The 2001–02 Israel State Cup (Gvia HaMedina) was the 63rd season of Israel's nationwide football cup competition and the 48th after the Israeli Declaration of Independence.

The competition was won by Maccabi Tel Aviv who had beaten Maccabi Haifa 5–4 on penalties after 0–0 in the final.

By winning, Maccabi Tel Aviv qualified to the 2002–03 UEFA Cup, entering in the qualifying round.

Results

Sixth Round

Seventh Round

Byes: Hapoel Ahva Haifa, Hapoel Tira, Ironi Kiryat Shmona, Ironi Nir Ramat HaSharon.

Intermediate Round

Eighth Round

Round of 16

Quarter-finals

Semi-finals

Final

References
100 Years of Football 1906–2006, Elisha Shohat (Israel), 2006, p. 316
Israel Cups 2001/02 RSSSF

Israel State Cup
State Cup
Israel State Cup seasons